Rhagonycha lignosa is a species of soldier beetles native to Europe.

References

Cantharidae
Beetles described in 1764
Beetles of Europe
Taxa named by Otto Friedrich Müller